A Span of Earth is a 1964 Soviet drama film directed by Andrey Smirnov and .

Plot 
The film takes place in the summer of 1944. The film tells about a young lieutenant and a battalion commander defending a bridgehead.

Cast 
 Aleksandr Zbruyev as Aleksandr Motovilov
 Elliya Sukhanova as Rita Tamashova
 Yevgeni Urbansky as Aleksey Babin
 Sergei Kurilov as Bryl
 Mikhail Vorontsov as Afanasiy Makletsov
 Aleksandr Titov as Shumilin
 Anatoli Golik as Mezentsev
 Viktor Suskin as Sayenko (as V. Suskin)
 Andrey Petrov as Pavchenko (as A. Petrov)
 Oleg Forostenko

References

External links 
 

1964 films
1960s Russian-language films
Soviet drama films
1964 drama films